This is a list of films produced in France in 1910.

See also
 1910 in France

External links
 French films of 1910 at the Internet Movie Database

1910
French
Films